Frederick Creighton "Newt" Hunter (January 5, 1880 – October 26, 1963) was an American first baseman, coach and scout in Major League Baseball.

During his stint with the 1911 Pirates, Hunter, then 31, collected 53 hits, including ten doubles, six triples and two home runs. He had a lengthy minor-league career as a player and playing manager (1903–1918, 1924).

See also
 List of St. Louis Cardinals coaches

References

External links 

 Retrosheet

1880 births
1963 deaths
Baltimore Orioles (IL) players
Baseball players from Ohio
Beaumont Millionaires players
Boston Red Sox scouts
Brenham Cotton Pickers players
Dallas Giants players
Fort Worth Panthers players
Houston Buffaloes players
Indianapolis Indians players
Joplin Miners players
Kalamazoo Kazoos players
Kansas City Blues (baseball) players
Lincoln Tigers players
Major League Baseball first basemen
Minneapolis Millers (baseball) players
Minor league baseball managers
Philadelphia Phillies coaches
Philadelphia Phillies scouts
Pittsburgh Pirates players
St. Louis Cardinals coaches
Sioux City Indians players
Sioux City Packers players
Sportspeople from Chillicothe, Ohio
Vicksburg Hill Billies players
Wilmington Peaches players